Lagunillas is a city in western Venezuela. It is the capital of the Sucre Municipality in Mérida State, located 30 kilometers from the city of Mérida.

References

Populated places in Mérida (state)